Sue Scherer is the Illinois state representative for the 96th district, serving since 2013. She is a member of the Democratic party. The 96th district includes all or parts of Springfield, Decatur, Taylorville, Blue Mound, Mount Auburn, Niantic, Edinburg and Rochester.

As of July 3, 2022, Representative Scherer is a member of the following Illinois House committees:

 Appropriations - Elementary & Secondary Education Committee (HAPE)
 (Chairwoman of) Citizen Impact Subcommittee (HMAC-CITI)
 (Chairwoman of) Elementary & Secondary Education: Administration, Licenses & Charter Committee (HELO)
 Higher Education Committee (HHED)
 Museums, Arts, & Cultural Enhancement Committee (HMAC)
 Small Business, Tech Innovation & Entrepreneurship Committee (SBTE)

References

External links
Representative Sue Scherer (D) 96th District at the Illinois General Assembly
By session: 98th
Sue Scherer for State Representative
 
Rep. Sue Scherer at Illinois House Democrats

Living people
Democratic Party members of the Illinois House of Representatives
Eastern Illinois University alumni
Illinois State University alumni
Year of birth missing (living people)
21st-century American politicians
21st-century American women politicians
Women state legislators in Illinois
People from Decatur, Illinois